Live at Red Rocks is a concert video album by the American singer-songwriter and Fleetwood Mac vocalist Stevie Nicks. It was filmed during Nicks' 1986 Rock a Little Tour. It features special guests Peter Frampton on guitar and Mick Fleetwood on drums. It was nominated for the Grammy Award for Best Performance Music Video in 1987. Originally released as an Enhanced CD-ROM in 1987, it was reissued on DVD in 2007.

Track listing
"Outside the Rain"
"Dreams"
"Talk to Me"
"I Need to Know" (Tom Petty and the Heartbreakers cover)
"No Spoken Word"
"Beauty and the Beast"
"Stand Back"
"Has Anyone Ever Written Anything for You?"
"Edge of Seventeen"

Personnel
Main performers
Stevie Nicks – vocals, tambourine
Waddy Wachtel – guitar
Peter Frampton – guitar
Mick Fleetwood – drums, percussion
Jennifer Condos – bass
Bobby Martin – horn, keyboards, background vocals
Jai Winding – keyboards
Bobbye Hall – percussion
Rick Marotta – drums
Sharon Celani – background vocals
Lori Perry-Nicks – background vocals
Elesecia Wright – background vocals

Certifications

References

Stevie Nicks albums
Live video albums
1986 live albums
1987 video albums
Reprise Records live albums
Reprise Records video albums
Albums recorded at Red Rocks Amphitheatre